Cotati station is a Sonoma–Marin Area Rail Transit station in Cotati, California. It opened to preview service on June 29, 2017; full commuter service commenced on August 25, 2017. It is located on Cotati Avenue. The station building was constructed by the city independently of the transit authority. The station has parking, including an electric vehicle charging station.

References

External links

Cotati Stations

Railway stations in the United States opened in 2017
2017 establishments in California
Sonoma-Marin Area Rail Transit stations in Sonoma County